Ademir da Guia (born 3 April 1942) is a retired professional footballer who played during the 1960s and 1970s for Palmeiras, a leading association football team in Brazil, where he is still regarded as one of the club's all-time best players. Usually a playmaker, he was known for his fantastic close control and passing ability. He was nicknamed O Divino, which means The Divine One, the same nickname given to his father, Domingos da Guia.

Personal life

Da Guia was born in Rio de Janeiro. His father, Domingos da Guia was a former national team member who played at the 1938 FIFA World Cup. His uncle, Ladislau da Guia, had pursued the same career path at an earlier stage, playing for Bangu Atlético Clube, and becoming their all-time best scorer with 215 goals.

Career
In the 16 years Ademir da Guia spent playing for Palmeiras, he holds the record for the most appearances for the club and is the third best goalscorer ever, and won, amongst other titles, both the Campeonato Paulista and the Campeonato Brasileiro Série A five times.

Unlike many distinguished football players in his country, Ademir did not have a prolonged and constant participation with the Brazilian national team; playing in nine matches for Brazil in the total, the first six in 1965 and the other three in 1974, including at the 1974 FIFA World Cup when he got the chance to play in the match for third place against Poland (in which Brazil was defeated by 1–0). His lack of playing time was the result of being contemporary of such players as Pelé, Rivelino, Gérson, Tostão, Dirceu Lopes and Paulo César.

Da Guia played his farewell match on 18 September 1977 at Estádio do Morumbi, São Paulo in a Campeonato Paulista match between his club Palmeiras and Corinthians, which the latter won 2–0.

Political career
He was elected in 2004 for the legislative period of 2005–2008 as councilman for the city of São Paulo as a member of the Communist Party of Brazil, joining the Liberal Party later.

Honours
 Brazilian Championship: 1967 (Taça Brasil), 1967 (Taça Roberto Gomes Pedrosa), 1969, 1972 and 1973
 São Paulo State Championship: 1963, 1966, 1972, 1974 and 1976.
 Rio-São Paulo Tournament: 1965
 IV Centenary of the City of Rio de Janeiro Tournament: 1965
 Ramón de Carranza Trophy (Spain): 1969, 1974 and 1975.
 Laudo Natel Tournament: 1972
 Mar del Plata Tournament (Argentina): 1972

References

1942 births
Living people
Footballers from Rio de Janeiro (city)
Brazilian footballers
1974 FIFA World Cup players
Brazil international footballers
Bangu Atlético Clube players
Sociedade Esportiva Palmeiras players
Campeonato Brasileiro Série A players
Brazilian sportsperson-politicians
Association football midfielders
Communist Party of Brazil politicians
Liberal Party (Brazil, 2006) politicians
Progressive Republican Party (Brazil) politicians
Afro-Brazilian sportspeople
Afro-Brazilian people
Brazilian people of German descent